Syrkovo is a rural locality (a village) in Zelentsovskoye Rural Settlement, Nikolsky District, Vologda Oblast, Russia. The population was 56 as of 2002.

Geography 
Syrkovo is located 53 km northeast of Nikolsk (the district's administrative centre) by road. Zelentsovo is the nearest rural locality.

References 

Rural localities in Nikolsky District, Vologda Oblast